Allunhari Abdou is a village in the Gambia. It is located in Niani District in the Upper River Division. As of 2009, it has an estimated population of 414.

References

Populated places in the Gambia
Upper River Division